Robert Eden may refer to:

Robert Eden, the name of several Eden baronets
Sir Robert Eden, 1st Baronet, of Maryland (c. 1741–1784), Governor of Maryland
Robert Eden (bishop) (1804–1886), Primus of Scotland and Bishop of Moray, Ross and Caithness
 Robert Eden, 3rd Baron Auckland (1799–1870), Bishop of Bath and Wells
Robert Anthony Eden (1897–1977), British politician

See also
 Eden baronets
 Robert Eden Duncombe Shafto (1776–1848), British politician
 Bobbi Eden (born 1980), Dutch pornographic actress